Saint-Léger-aux-Bois may refer to the following places in France:

 Saint-Léger-aux-Bois, Oise, a commune in the Oise department
 Saint-Léger-aux-Bois, Seine-Maritime, a commune in the Seine-Maritime department